Bituing Walang Ningning is a 2006 musical television drama series that aired on ABS-CBN from May 15 to September 29, 2006, replacing Gulong ng Palad. For most of its run, the soap opera was the network's highest rated show in prime time. The station referred to the TV series as Sineserye, meaning Movie Serialized TV Series.

It stars an ensemble cast including Sarah Geronimo, Angelika Dela Cruz, Zsa Zsa Padilla, Amy Austria, Tonton Gutierrez, Ryan Agoncillo, John Prats, Carlo Aquino and Ai-Ai delas Alas.

The series was supposed to end on September 18, 2006, but ended on September 29, 2006, due to coverage of the special concert staged at the Smart Araneta Coliseum and a taped interview for the series on September 12 and also rehearsals, taping and dubbing which occurred during the run. The finale was in five parts for its finale week, introduced its current prime time series Maging Sino Ka Man with its pilot episode moved to a different timeslot and would also be the replacement of the phenomenal TV series. On October 1, 2006, a "Himig of Pasasalamat Concert" was staged at the Araneta with all of the characters which was also televised live. The series also showed a glimpse of behind-the-scenes footage and also sung the themes from its successful album produced by Star Records and Viva Records. Although, it was said that some parts of the series were supposed to also be produced by Viva such as songs sung by Sarah Geronimo herself and the theme of the song was originally popularized by Sharon Cuneta in the film. This was Carlo Aquino's final appearance of the show before moving to its rival network GMA 7 in November whereas Hero Angeles who also moved to the same network when he controversially ended his Star Magic contract in 2005 and Errol Abalayan who did not continue his own acting (both former SCQ teen questors), although they both did not join the ensemble cast.

Production started in January through mid September airing the next following week of the concert airing on Sundays best two taped interviews were taped separately before Sarah and Angelika would go on doing different soaps in 2007 Sarah Geronimo did a follow up soap with a similar storyline Pangarap na Bituin the soap was taped weekly until Geronimo turned 18 years old in August due to labor laws during filming in August her debut was also taped during the series and Dela Cruz opened up that in the past her manager Boy Abunda asked her to do this soap which became a game changer as Dela Cruz was known for playing sassy heroines in Soap or TV projects as her image was as of Maricel Soriano.

Origin
The story started as a serialised comic strip by Nerissa Cabral. It was adapted into a movie in 1985 with the same title by Viva Films, directed by Emmanuel H. Borlaza and starred Sharon Cuneta as Dorina Pineda, Cherie Gil as Lavinia Arguelles, and Christopher de Leon as Nico Escobar. It was produced by Vic del Rosario, Jr. of VIVA Entertainment. The film became an instant hit, quickly developing a cult following and produced the popular line ""You're nothing but a second-rate, trying hard copycat!", uttered in the film by Lavinia.

Television series
In 2006, ABS-CBN bought the rights from Nerissa Cabral to turn the film into a TV series. She agreed to do the remake with the conditions of Sarah Geronimo portraying the role of Dorina Pineda and that the story would stay true to the fan-star relationship depicted in the original story. Angelika Dela Cruz later was tapped as Lavina Arguelles. Promotional shoots began in early January while taping started from early January to April then throughout. On the Sunday show ASAP the two had to play their characters from the soap to link for the then-upcoming episodes. Some changes to the story from the original script such as Rosa Mia being played by Zsa-Zsa Padilla, Emilio played by Tonton Gutierrez, and Adora played by Ai-Ai Delas Alas in her first prime time drama series. It additionally starred Amy Austria as Barbara Arguelles, Carla Humphries as Rita Arguelles, and then Tuesday Vargas' Libby character in her more serious debut. Apart from being a comedian her character counterpart on the show had more admiration for Dorina and played Larry Calmas' assistant.

Synopsis
Emilio and Rosa Mia are a loving couple expecting their first child. Rosa Mia is a devout, aspiring singer, who works at cheap bars to earn a living while Emilio is a security guard where Rosa Mia works. When the bar owner learns of their relationship and Rosa Mia's pregnancy, a talk show host fires them from the club leaving them jobless and destitute yet optimistic.

One night, as Emilio was out seeking employment, Rosa Mia goes into labour. With no one around, she runs outside and into the pouring rain to get to the hospital. Fortunately, Emilio arrives and sees Rosa Mia struggling, but Rosa Mia already gives birth in the street to a baby girl they name Emilia Rose.

Emilia Rose becomes a sickly child, developing lung problems which brings her in and out of the hospital. Rising medical bills force a desperate Rosa Mia to accept a month-long singing engagement in Cebu, leaving Emilio to care for the baby on his own. He brings Emillia Rose with him out on his new job as a security guard in another club. On one occasion, Emilio's boss has him deliver a package to a different club, so he leaves the baby with his acquaintance Adora, a rose seller in the red-light district of Malate. Adora agrees to mind the baby for a few minutes, waiting outside the club for Emilio's return. Unbeknownst to Adora, Emilio is arrested inside the club because the package turns out to filled with drugs. Adora waits all night for Emilio, who never returns, and brings the baby home with her.

The loss of Emilia Rose and Emilio's imprisonment lead to bitterness and estrangement between Emilio and Rosa Mia. Adora has meanwhile grown to love the baby and decides to raise her as her own, calling her Adorina, or "Dorina" for short. Meanwhile, with the loss of her child, Rosa Mia throws herself into her music and is discovered by Lauro Calma, a record producer. He develops Rosa Mia into a star, asking her not to reveal that she is married and a mother. Rosa Mia agrees, and soon rises to fame as the "Sensational Diva". Dorina meanwhile grows up to be happily with Adora, and both become avid fans of Rosa Mia.

Meanwhile, Lavinia, an up-and-coming singer, emerges on the scene. Her ambitious mother, Barbara, tells Lavinia to befriend Rosa Mia to boost her popularity. Lonely and vulnerable, Rosa Mia takes Lavinia under her wing, seeking a replacement for her lost daughter. With Rosa Mia's help, Lavinia also becomes very popular, which is not enough for Barbara who wants Lavinia to be on top. Barbara connives with Larry Calma, the son of Rosa Mia's manager, Lauro.

Larry wants to prove himself to his father so he handles Lavinia and connives with Barbara to knock off Rosa Mia from the top spot, leaving Lavinia as the ultimate and most popular singer. Through intrigue and character assassination, they succeed in causing Rosa Mia to fall from grace, bereft of her reputation and popularity. Rosa Mia decides to leave the show business and returns to singing in small clubs.

Soon, Dorina begins to idolize Lavinia. She goes to her every concert, show and personal appearances to catch a glimpse of her idol and offer her Sampaguita. But Dorina also loves to sing. With the help of Adora and her best friend Oman, Dorina joins singing contests until she eventually wins in a nationwide and televised singing contest. She gains the attention of all, including Nico Escobar, the boyfriend of Lavinia.

Nico is in love with Lavinia, but it becomes clear that Lavinia is too involved in her career. She refuses to marry him, fearing that doing so would damage her popularity. Bitter and angry, Nico wants to show Lavinia that her career should not be top priority in her life, so he plans to develop another singer as Lavinia's rival to supplant her. Nico uses Dorina to accomplish this, and with his friend Zossimo, sets up Zoni Records to develop Dorina's singing career. Dorina soon finds herself admiring Nico and developing feelings for him, but she does not know how Nico feels about her. Dorina's interest in Nico comes as a blow to her best friend Oman and her bandmate Gary, both of whom are in love with Dorina.

Dorina gains fame, causing Lavinia to see her as a threat. After a big event, Lavinia becomes so enraged by Dorina's great performance and attention of all that she attacks Dorina and calls her a copycat, prompting the latter to fight back. Nico and Zossimo find a song once composed by Rosa Mia before she left the music scene. They buy the rights to the song from Rosa Mia and ask her to help Dorina with her singing. At first, Rosa Mia refuses after what happened with Lavinia, but she eventually relents and agrees to help her out. They soon become close, not knowing of their real relationship.

Not long after, Emilio is released from prison, and he sets out to find Adora and his daughter. He later succeeds, only to learn that his daughter is now Dorina, the singer he had been admiring while still in jail. Emilio decides not to tell Dorina of their true relationship for fear of ruining her career, but to be close to his daughter, he takes on a job as her chauffeur and bodyguard.

Dorina eventually knows her real parents, and at the last concert her emotions flow to the last song. Rosa Mia and Emilio are reunited, Adora is gone, while Nico forgives Lavinia, and Oman and Dorina become a couple.

Cast and characters 

The following table summarizes the main cast.

Differences in the television series
A number of plot and character differences were introduced in the TV version, in part to extend the limited storyline of the movie:
 Dorina's birth parents (biological father & mother and also has an adoptive mother and younger sister) are new additions to the story.
 Lavinia's family (mother, sister) are also new additions.
 The TV version attempts to provide an explanation for Lavinia's evil ways; no explanation was provided in the movie.
 While the TV version stayed faithful to the fact that Nico made Dorina a star, it also shows that her career was helped by her joining a competition Search for the Star in a Million.
 The character of Oman is also a new addition.
 The TV version has three love triangles (Dorina-Oman-Gary, Lavinia-Nico-Larry and Dorina-Nico-Lavinia). In the movie version, the primary love triangles were between Dorina-Nico-Lavinia and Gary-Dorina-Nico.
 The TV version is on a Compact Disc (CD); instead the Laser Disc (or Records) for the movie version.
 The TV version staged a Grand Showdown, dubbed as "The Clash of the Divas", between Dorina and Lavinia (very much like the one also featuring the final showdown between Dorina and Lavinia). The Grand Showdown scenes were taped in front of a live audience of more than 15,000 viewers on September 19, 2006, at the Araneta Coliseum. Selected scenes from the Grand Showdown were used in the show's final episodes.
 The September 24, 2006 episode of The Buzz interviewed Sarah Geronimo and Angelika Dela Cruz in their characters on the TV series as part of the show's promotion. The Buzz made it appear as if Boy Abunda is interviewing Dorina, and Kris Aquino is interviewing Lavinia, in real-time. Sarah Geronimo had a taped interview with Boy Abunda in the role of Dorina, while Angelika Dela Cruz, in the character of Lavinia, reacted to Dorina's interview in a live interview with Kris Aquino. The interview was also aired the next day in the fifth to the last episode of the series.
 In the film, Dorina has an aunt while in the TV series she has an adoptive mother.

Trivia about the TV series
 Actress Angelika Dela Cruz was originally hesitant to accept the role of Lavinia, fearing that she would be typecasted in antagonist roles. She eventually decided to accept the role because (among other reasons) it gave her a chance to resume her singing career, which had been on hold for several years due to legal problems with her previous recording label.
 Two rival entertainment reporters on the TV series (Oscar and Edith) are portrayed by real-life husband and wife Benjie Felipe and Lisa Andaya.
 The Grand Showdown that was taped at the Araneta Coliseum also held a post-finale concert, featuring several ABS-CBN artists, with Aga Muhlach as the most important guest. The concert was majorly sponsored by Jollibee and was aired on ABS-CBN on October 15, 2006.
 In the then-recently concluded ASAP Pop Viewers' Choice Awards 2006, this series won Pop TV Show of the Year, Pop TV Theme Song and Pop TV Character (Dorina Pineda).
 Bituing Walang Ningning was one of the "Most Well-Liked TV Program" winners of the Year in the Anak TV Seal Awards 2006.
 It is the third "Sineserye" to be made.
 The series re-aired on the Kapamilya Channel on Direct TV in September 2008.
 No DVD release has been scheduled for the series.
 The Teleserye was supposed to approximately run till September but it was extended due to the concert and due to its high ratings.

Soundtrack

The Bituing Walang Ningning soundtrack is jointly produced by Viva Records and Star Music. The soundtrack was released in May 2006, before the series began airing and features performances by cast members. The album reached Gold status selling more than 15,000 copies nationwide.

The tracks in the original soundtrack are:
 Bituing Walang Ningning – Sarah Geronimo
 Sana'y Maghintay ang Walang Hanggan – Zsa Zsa Padilla
 Nasaan Ka Man – Zsa Zsa Padilla and Sarah Geronimo
 Miss na Miss Kita – Angelika dela Cruz
 Dito Ba – Sarah Geronimo and Angelika dela Cruz
 Hold On – Chris Cayzer
 Kanta Tayo – Ai-Ai de las Alas
 Bakit Ba Ganyan – Carlo Aquino
 Missing You – Jay Perillo
 Bituing Walang Ningning (Radio Edit)

The soundtrack was repackaged in July 2006 and re-released with two additional tracks:

 Felt So Right – Sarah Geronimo
 Million Miles Away – Sarah Geronimo

Reception

Ratings 
Bituing Walang Ningning garnered 29.2% (Mega Manila) for its pilot episode against its rival show Extra Challenge, which garnered 32% on the same day. The show continued to plunge down and soar up from the low to high 20s, and was pitted against many Telefantasyas, such as Captain Barbell after Extra Challenge ended. Although it was ABS-CBN's highest rated show for almost all of its run in Mega Manila Area, it was constantly beaten by programs on the GMA Network. However, for its final episode, Bituing Walang Ningning shot up to 34.8% making it a staggering success against its GMA 7 counterpart "Majika" which got 26% allowing the TV series to be no.1 for its final episode, challenging GMA Network's dominance in Mega Manila Area. In the nationwide ratings, released by AGB Nielsen Phils., Bituing Walang Ningning became the 2nd highest rated TV show for the year 2006, garnering a whopping 45.1%, with the daily ratings of 40% and above.

In Mega Manila, its highest rating is 35.6%, the lowest was 25.3% with an average of 29.7%. While in Nationwide ratings, its highest rating was 48.3% while the lowest was 36.4%, and the average of 42.5%.

Weekly ratings (Mega Manila)

Source: AGBNMR Philippines

Accolades

See also
List of programs aired by ABS-CBN
List of telenovelas of ABS-CBN

References

External links
 
 

ABS-CBN drama series
Philippine drama films
Tagalog-language films
2006 Philippine television series debuts
2006 Philippine television series endings
Philippine musical television series
Live action television shows based on films
Television series by Viva Television
Filipino-language television shows
Television shows set in Manila
Television shows set in Cebu